Lees is a village in the Metropolitan Borough of Oldham, Greater Manchester, England and it is unparished.  It contains seven listed buildings that are recorded in the National Heritage List for England.  Of these, one is listed at Grade II*, the middle grade, and the others are at Grade II, the lowest grade. The listed buildings consist of two churches, a public house, a mill, two houses, and a war memorial.


Key

Buildings

References

Citations

Sources

Lists of listed buildings in Greater Manchester
Buildings and structures in the Metropolitan Borough of Oldham